Thank You a Lot is a 2014 American drama film directed by Matt Muir. Set in Austin, Texas, the film stars Blake DeLong as a struggling music manager who is forced to sign his estranged father, country music singer James Hand (played by the eponymous country musician).

The film premiered at the 2014 South by Southwest Film Festival as part of the Narrative Spotlight Section.

Plot 
Jack Hand (Blake DeLong) is a  hustling music manager of a hip-hop artist and an indie rock band. Jack’s  estranged musician father, James Hand, is a respected but reclusive songwriter living and working in  Austin. Jack is pressured by his management company to sign his musician father to a deal or lose his job there.

Cast 
 Blake DeLong as Jack Hand
 James Hand as James Hand
 Robyn Rikoon as Allison
 Sonny Carl Davis as Frank
 Jeffrey Da'Shade Johnson as Desmond D
 Kaci Beeler as Sissy
 Indigo Rael as Steph

Background and production 
Muir began writing the script for actor and long-time friend Blake DeLong. After seeing James Hand perform in Austin, Muir said he decided to base a character on him: 
 With the script completed, Muir reached out to Hand, who agreed to play the fictionalized version of himself.
Principal photography took place over eighteen days in August, 2012, after a successful Kickstarter campaign. Most of the film was shot in and around Austin, Texas, and features appearances by various locals, including David Wingo, Andy Langer, Sam Wainwright Douglas, and Zell Miller III. All musical performances  were captured live.

Release and reception 
The film has screened at South by Southwest Film Festival, Dallas International Film Festival and others, receiving mostly positive reviews. Austin Film Society-published site, Slackerwood, praised writer/director Muir and noted that DeLong and Hand had a chemistry that was "hilariously realistic". D Magazine and other outlets commended Hand on his performance despite a lack of acting experience. Truth On Cinema praised  first-time director Muir and the "immersive on screen experience" he delivered.

For his work on this and other films, producer Chris Ohlson received the Independent Spirit Piaget Producers Award.

References

External links 
 
 

2014 films
Films set in Austin, Texas
American musical drama films
Films shot in Austin, Texas
Films about singers
Kickstarter-funded films
2010s English-language films
2010s American films